Margaret Gardner  is an Australian academic, community leader and economist.

Margaret Gardner may also refer to:

Margaret Gardner (immigrant)
Margaret Gardner (badminton) on French Open (badminton)
Margaret Gardner Hoey, First Lady of North Carolina

See also
Margaret Gardiner (disambiguation)